Karl Theodor Reye (born 20 June 1838 in Ritzebüttel, Germany and died 2 July 1919 in Würzburg, Germany) was a German mathematician.  He contributed to geometry, particularly projective geometry and synthetic geometry. He is best known for his introduction of configurations in the second edition of his book, Geometrie der Lage (Geometry of Position, 1876). The Reye configuration of 12 points, 12 planes, and 16 lines is named after him.

Reye also developed a novel solution to the following three-dimensional extension of the problem of Apollonius:  Construct all possible spheres that are simultaneously tangent to four given spheres.

Life

Reye obtained his Ph.D. from the University of Göttingen in 1861.  His dissertation was entitled "Die mechanische Wärme-Theorie und das Spannungsgesetz der Gase" (The mechanical theory of heat and the potential law of gases).

Mathematical work

Reye worked on conic sections, quadrics and projective geometry.

Reye's work on linear manifolds of projective plane pencils and of bundles on spheres influenced later work by Corrado Segre on manifolds. He introduced Reye congruences, the earliest examples of Enriques surfaces.

References

Further reading
  (NB. Theodor Reye was a polytechnician in Zürich in 1860, but later became a professor in Straßburg. This paper established  and laid the foundation to what is known as Reye–Archard–Khrushchov wear law today.

External links
 
 
 Theodor Reye (1892) Die Geometrie der Lage from archive.org.
 
 

1838 births
1919 deaths
Geometers
19th-century German mathematicians
University of Göttingen alumni
Academic staff of ETH Zurich
Academic staff of RWTH Aachen University
Academic staff of the University of Strasbourg
Heads of universities in Germany
20th-century German mathematicians